"Angel" is the second European single from Pharrell Williams's debut album, In My Mind (2006).

The song debuted on November 29, 2005 in the UK and was backed heavily by BBC Radio 1, where at one point it was their most played record. It was also made Record of the Week by UK DJ Scott Mills.

The single was originally due for release on December 5, 2005, but because the album In My Mind was pushed back, the single was released on January 21, 2006. The single was not released in the U.S. or Australia due to the underperformance of "Can I Have It Like That" in both countries.

Music video
There are two versions of the "Angel" video. The first, which was never released to television, combined both animation and live action shots. The second video, directed by Hype Williams, was the version released to television in the UK and is the more widely known version.

Track listing
UK CD

 "Angel" (Radio Version)
 "Angel" (Axwell Mix)

UK DVD
 "Angel" (Instrumental)
 "Angel" (Video)
 "Can I Have It Like That" (Featuring Gwen Stefani) (Video)

UK Vinyl
 "Angel" (Radio Version)
 "Angel" (Instrumental)
 "Angel" (Axwell Mix)
 "Angel" (A Cappella)

UK Promo CD
 "Angel" (Radio Version)
 "Angel" (Album Version - Explicit)
 "Angel" (Instrumental)
 "Angel" (A Cappella)

Charts

Release history

References

2006 singles
Pharrell Williams songs
Songs written by Pharrell Williams
Song recordings produced by Pharrell Williams
Music videos directed by Hype Williams
2006 songs
Virgin Records singles